Bojan Radetić (born August 19, 1988) is a Serbian professional basketball player who last played for Pagrati of the Greek A2 Basket League. He is a 2.03 m (6 ft 8 in) tall power forward.

Professional career
Senior career began in Borac Čačak where he played since 2007 to 2009 year. Then one season he plays in FMP Železnik. In 2011 he managed to impose Pešić and get into the first team of Crvena zvezda. In January 2013, he signed with Igokea. In July 2013, he signed with Śląsk Wrocław. He left them before the start of the season. In November 2013, he joined OKK Beograd. In February 2014, he signed with Gaz Metan Mediaş for the rest of the season. For the 2014–15 season he returned to OKK Beograd. In September 2015, he signed with Bulgarian club BC Yambol.

Serbian national team
Radetić was member of the junior national teams of Serbia. He played at the 2008 FIBA Europe Under-20 Championship in Latvia, where he won the gold medal.

References

External links
 Bojan Radetić at aba-liga.com
 Bojan Radetić at eurobasket.com
 Bojan Radetić at fiba.com

1988 births
Living people
ABA League players
Basketball League of Serbia players
BC Yambol players
Bosnia and Herzegovina expatriate basketball people in Serbia
KK Borac Čačak players
KK Crvena zvezda players
KK FMP (1991–2011) players
KK Igokea players
OKK Beograd players
Pagrati B.C. players
Power forwards (basketball)
Serbian expatriate basketball people in Bulgaria
Serbian expatriate basketball people in Greece
Serbian expatriate basketball people in Romania
Serbian expatriate basketball people in Sweden
Serbian men's basketball players
Serbs of Bosnia and Herzegovina
Sportspeople from Banja Luka